Bobana Veličković (25 January 1990 – 21 June 2020) was a Serbian sport shooter. At the 2012 Summer Olympics, she competed in the Women's 10 metre air pistol.  At the 2016 Summer Olympics, she competed in the Women's 10 metre air pistol and the Women's 25 metre pistol, finishing in 7th place in 10m.

Death
On 21 June 2020, Veličković died due to complications at childbirth including pre-eclampsia.

References

 "Potresno! Poslednje fotografije i prepiska Bobane sa lekarom pred smrt! U jednoj napisala: Umirem od bolova (FOTO)". 24sedam.rs (in Serbian). 26 April 2022.

External links
 
 
 
 

1990 births
2020 deaths
Serbian female sport shooters
Olympic shooters of Serbia
Shooters at the 2012 Summer Olympics
Shooters at the 2016 Summer Olympics
European Games competitors for Serbia
European champions for Serbia
Shooters at the 2015 European Games
Shooters at the 2019 European Games
People from Bor, Serbia
Deaths in childbirth
20th-century Serbian women
21st-century Serbian women